Eleuterio Ramírez Molina (April 18, 1837 in Osorno – November 27, 1879 in Tarapacá) was a Chilean military figure. He founded the Foro Militar military newspaper in 1871.

Tributes
His remains lie within the "Infantry Regiment No. 2 Maipo" (former 2nd Line) located in Playa Ancha, Valparaiso . His crypt mausoleum was inaugurated in 1937 by President Arturo Alessandri Palma, and can be accessed by civilians.

References

1837 births
1879 deaths
People from Osorno, Chile
Chilean military personnel of the War of the Pacific
Military personnel killed in the War of the Pacific